Julian Kyle Silverio Macaraeg (born May 15, 2003) is a Filipino-American short-track speed skater who competed in the 2020 Winter Youth Olympics in Lausanne.

Early life 
Julian Macaraeg was born on May 15, 2003, in New York City to Filipino parents who immigrated to the United States in the 1990s. Macaraeg began skating at the age of three and also played ice hockey at the age of 4 and then switched to speed skating in 2010. On April 18, 2021, Macaraeg announced that he would be attending the University of California, Los Angeles.

Career

2019 Southeast Asian Games
Macaraeg competed at short track speed skating event of the 2019 Southeast Asian Games which was hosted at in the Philippines. However he did not win a medal.

2020 Winter Youth Olympics
Macaraeg was one of two Filipino athletes to be selected to attend the 2020 Winter Youth Olympics, and in doing so became the first Filipino short track speed skater to compete at the Youth Olympics. He qualified through his second-place finish in the 500m event of the 2019 ISU Junior World Short Track Championships in Canada. In the 500m, Macaraeg won his qualifying heat, moving him on to the quarterfinals, however he did not advance in the 1000m, and his Mixed-NOC relay made it to the B Final.

2021 World Championships
At the 2021 World Short Track Speed Skating Championships in the Netherlands, Macaraeg is the sole competitor for the Philippines for the tournament. He competed in the 500m, 1,000m, and 1,500m events placing 39th, 42nd, and 35th, respectively.

References 

2003 births
Filipino male short track speed skaters
Short track speed skaters at the 2020 Winter Youth Olympics
People from New York City
American people of Filipino descent
Competitors at the 2019 Southeast Asian Games
Living people
Southeast Asian Games competitors for the Philippines